The Wethersfield Cove is a natural inlet in Wethersfield, Connecticut, and a former site of much local trade and travel.

Geography
Wethersfield Cove is ten feet above sea level and forty miles from Long Island Sound. It was originally an oxbow in the Connecticut River. It is located near Old Wethersfield, one of the oldest settlements in the United States.

History
Thomas Deming built his shipyard on the banks of this natural harbor.  Deming launched the Tryall, the first ship built in Connecticut, from the cove in 1649. From 1650-1830, trade with the West Indies thrived. Merchants exported lumber, grain, onions, salted beef, fish and pork, and in exchange received salt, sugar, molasses and rum from the Caribbean. "The Cove" was also noted in Revolutionary times as "Blackbird Pond".

Pollution
Some citizens have protested the continued letting of raw sewage into the cove, especially after the accidental spilling of 20 million gallons of sewage in 1997, and are lobbying for it to stop, but such redesigns would run into the hundreds of millions of dollars. The Metropolitan District Commission of Connecticut's multi-billion dollar Clean Water Project seeks to address this problem.

References

External links

Cove Park site
Wethersfield Historical Society

Wethersfield, Connecticut
Estuaries of Connecticut